Nancy Lipton Rosenblum (born November 10, 1947) is an American political scientist and political philosopher. She is the Senator Joseph S. Clark Professor of Ethics in Politics and Government at Harvard University and co-editor of the Annual Review of Political Science. She studies modern political thought and constitutional law. Rosenblum has been the Chair of both the government department at Harvard and the political science department at Brown University, and a member of the leadership of several professional organizations in political science and political philosophy.

Early life and education
Rosenblum was born on November 10, 1947. She was the oldest of seven children born to an economist father and social worker mother in Teaneck, New Jersey. Rosenblum earned her Bachelor of Arts degree from Radcliffe College and her PhD in Political Science from Harvard University.

Career
Upon earning her PhD, Rosenblum accepted the Henry LaBarre Jayne Assistant Professor position at her alma mater's Department of Government from 1973 until 1977. She was eventually promoted to Associate professor from 1977 until 1980 when she moved to Brown University. During this time, she published her first book titled  Bentham's Theory of the Modern State, in which she synthesizes a variety of arguments by Jeremy Bentham to argue that one of his major accomplishments was an innovative theory of the modern state, together with a theory of how politics should be modernized.

Upon joining the political science department at Brown in 1980, Rosenblum became their first female faculty member in history. During her time at Brown, she served as Chairperson of the political science department and their Henry Merritt Wriston Professor. In 1987, she published Another Liberalism: Romanticism and the Reconstruction of Liberal Thought through the Harvard University Press. In the book, Rosenblum describes the dynamic of romanticism and liberalism as one of mutual opposition and reconciliation. In 1993, Rosenblum was given an honorary degree by Kalamazoo College. Following the publication of Another Liberalism, she authored another book in 1998 titled Membership and Morals: The Personal Uses of Pluralism in America, which received the 2002 David Easton Prize by the Foundations of Political Theory. In Membership and Morals, Rosenblum uses historical research and legal analysis to argue that courts have interpreted individuals' belonging to political organizations mainly in terms of how their participation advances the organization's formal political goals, whereas it is necessary to also consider how affiliation with an association can serve an expressive purpose. Rosenblum was also an editor of Liberalism and the Moral Life (1993), Thoreau: Political Writings, Cambridge Texts in the History of Political Thought (1996), and Obligations of Citizenship and Demands of Faith: Religious Accommodation in Pluralist Democracies (2000).

During her time at Brown, Rosenblum periodically visited Harvard, and she moved back full time in 2001. Shortly after arriving again at Harvard, Rosenblum was appointed the Sen. Joseph Clark Professor of Ethics in Politics and Government professor and honored as a Fellow of the American Academy of Arts and Sciences. She also edited Civil Society and Government with Robert Post and Breaking the Cycles of Hatred: Memory, Law, and Repair, and was appointed Chair of the Department of Government. She was the Department Chair from 2004 to 2010. In 2010, Rosenblum published On the Side of the Angels: An Appreciation of Parties and Partisanship, in which she argues against criticisms of partisan politics as being polarizing, destructive, and un-democratic, arguing instead that partisanship is essentially a productive force that creates political interests and opinions while also being congruent with the core virtues of democracy.

Rosenblum was named the recipient of a Walter Channing Cabot Fellowship for "distinguished accomplishments in the fields of literature, history, or art, broadly conceived", awarded for On the Side of the Angels, and was elected the Vice-President of the American Political Science Association. She has also been President of the American Society for Political and Legal Philosophy, and a member of the Board of the Russell Sage Foundation.

In 2016, Rosenblum published the book Good Neighbors: The Democracy of Everyday Life in America. In Good Neighbors, Rosenblum argues that neighborliness is a type of everyday democracy that is practiced well in the real world but has received minimal scholarly attention, in contrast to "citizenship", which has received a great deal of theorizing but is practiced poorly in the real world. In Good Neighbors, Rosenblum complements the rich history of theories about citizenship by developing a moral and political theory about what makes a good neighbor.

In A Lot of People Are Saying: The New Conspiracism and the Assault on Democracy (2020) Rosenblum and Russell Muirhead examine the history and psychology of conspiracy theories and the ways in which they are used to de-legitimize the political system.  They distinguish between classical conspiracy theory in which actual events and issues are examined and combined to create a theory, and a new form of "conspiracism without theory" that relies on the repetition of false statements and hearsay without invoking a basis of factual grounding.

Personal life
Rosenblum and her husband Richard had one daughter together, Anna Rosenblum Palmer. After Richard's death in 2000, Rosenblum donated his sculpture Adam to the New Orleans Museum of Art.

Works

See also

Harvard University

References

External links

Nancy Rosenblum - Scholars at Harvard

1947 births
Living people
People from Teaneck, New Jersey
American women political scientists
American political scientists
American writers
Harvard University faculty
Fellows of the American Academy of Arts and Sciences
Brown University faculty
Radcliffe College alumni
Political science journal editors
American women academics
Annual Reviews (publisher) editors
21st-century American women